Mostafa Amr Ahmed Ahmed Hassan (born 16 December 1995) is an Egyptian athlete specialising in the shot put. He finished in the top 8 at the 2020 Olympic games in Tokyo, Japan. He competed at the 2015, 2017, and 2019 World Championships. He is the 2017 NCAA D1 indoor shot put champion, and the Egyptian record holder both indoor and outdoor. 
 
His personal best in the event is 21.31 meters set in Torrance, Ca in 2017 at the 2017 Mt. SAC Relays.

Competition record

See also
 Egypt at the 2015 World Championships in Athletics

References

Egyptian male shot putters
Living people
Place of birth missing (living people)
1995 births
World Athletics Championships athletes for Egypt
Athletes (track and field) at the 2019 African Games
African Games medalists in athletics (track and field)
African Games bronze medalists for Egypt
Athletes (track and field) at the 2018 Mediterranean Games
Mediterranean Games competitors for Egypt
Athletes (track and field) at the 2020 Summer Olympics
Olympic athletes of Egypt